René Rokkjær is a Danish orienteering competitor. He won a bronze medal with the Danish relay team at the 2002 European Orienteering Championships, and a silver medal in 2004. His best individual result at the World Orienteering Championships is a 13th place in sprint in 2003. At the 2006 World Orienteering Championships he placed 8th in the relay with the Danish team.

References

External links
 

Year of birth missing (living people)
Living people
Danish orienteers
Male orienteers
Foot orienteers